Hidden City is the tenth studio album by the British rock band The Cult, released on 5 February 2016 through Cooking Vinyl and Dine Alone Records. It is the final part of a trilogy that began with Born into This (2007), and The Cult's first album since their 1994 self-titled album not to feature bassist Chris Wyse; the role was filled by producer Bob Rock and  Chris Chaney (Jane's Addiction). It also marks the fifth time Rock had produced a Cult album.

Reception

Hidden City has received generally mixed to positive reviews from critics. AllMusic writer Thom Jurek gave the album three out of five stars, saying that it "touches on almost every period in their history." He continued his review, stating that "Billy Duffy's signature boogie-matic post-Electric riffing struts out in front of drummer John Tempesta's hard-swinging snare and thumping tom-tom vamp. Ian Astbury's baritone remains a tremendous thundering force, authoritatively delivering a typically messy lyric swamp of Tibetan Buddhist mysticism and Native American spirituality that warns of coming karmic consequences for exploitative and destructive behavior. Rock's wildly busy, over the top production swirls around it all." Dom Gourlay writing for Drowned in Sound stated, "despite being active on and off for the best part of 33 years, their creative flame still burns brightly if tenth studio album Hidden City is anything to go by... More importantly, Hidden City slides succinctly into the upper echelons of the band's impressive canon, and that is no mean feat." Exclaim!'''s Jibril Yassin wrote, "On the Cult's tenth studio album, Hidden City, the long-running British act seem to have hit a new creative streak. Hidden City is the band's third album in recent years, and it's chock full of call-backs to various points in their career..."

Lauren Murphy in her review of The Irish Times commented, "Atmosphere comes at the expense of innovation, but Hidden City is certainly a listenable collection, if perhaps only one for established fans who already know exactly what to expect." A reviewer of The National commented, "The Cult have had their ups and downs through their 30-year career. Hidden City shows the band climbing new heights." A reviewer of The Press wrote, "The Cult's tenth studio album finds them delivering a powerful mix of the brutal and the beautiful, the spiritual and the reflective." Dave Simpson writing for The Guardian'' mentioned, "The reinventions aren’t as dramatic now, but they’re still not standing still. Their 10th album darts from brooding postpunk to old-fashioned heavy metal and back again. At the heart is still the curious chemistry between gruff-toned, cosmically inclined singer Ian Astbury and his polar opposite, down-to-earth Mancunian guitarist Billy Duffy, the Cult’s own human riff."

Accolades

Track listing
 "Dark Energy" - 4:28
 "No Love Lost" - 3:13
 "Dance the Night" - 4:15
 "In Blood" - 4:48
 "Birds of Paradise" - 6:26
 "Hinterland" - 5:06
 "G O A T" - 3:18
 "Deeply Ordered Chaos" - 4:32
 "Avalanche of Light" - 4:31
 "Lilies" - 4:16
 "Heathens" - 3:39
 "Sound and Fury" - 3:54

Music videos
 "G O A T" - Dir: Juan Azulay
 "Hinterland" - Dir: Juan Azulay
 "Deeply Ordered Chaos" - Dir: Juan Azulay
 "Dark Energy" - Dir: Juan Azulay

Personnel
The Cult
 Ian Astbury – vocals, tambourine, etc. & additional guitars
 Billy Duffy – guitars
 John Tempesta – drums
Additional personnel
 Chris Chaney - bass
 Bob Rock - bass on "Dance the Night", "Birds of Paradise" and "Deeply Ordered Chaos", and additional guitars 
 Jamie Muhoberac - piano, keyboards
 Dan Chase - additional drums on "Sound and Fury"
Technical
Ted Jensen - mastering engineer

Note
Just prior to this album's release, Damon Fox (keyboards) and Grant Fitzpatrick (bassist) were made full-time members of the band.  However, they made no contributions to this album.

Charts

References

Albums produced by Bob Rock
The Cult albums
2016 albums
Cooking Vinyl albums
Dine Alone Records albums